Naria citrina, common name the orange cowrie, is a species of sea snail, a cowry, a marine gastropod mollusk in the family Cypraeidae, the cowries.

Subspecies
Naria citrina citrina Gray, 1825
Naria citrina dauphinensis Lorenz, 2002
 Naria citrina solangeae Bozzetti, 2014: synonym of Naria citrina dauphinensis (Lorenz, 2002)

Description
Fine teeth. Orange-brown with grey spots. Base orange-brown.

Distribution
This species and its subspecies occur in the Indian Ocean off the East Coast of South Africa, Madagascar and Mozambique.

References

Naria citrina solangeae (Gastropoda: Cypraeidae) nuova sottospecie dal Madagascar Sud-Orientale. Malacologia Mostra Mondiale 85: 11-12
 Lorenz, F. (2017). Cowries. A guide to the gastropod family Cypraeidae. Volume 1, Biology and systematics. Harxheim: ConchBooks. 644 pp.

External links
 Gray, J.E. (1824-1828). Monograph on the Cypraeidae, a family of testaceous Mollusca. Zoological Journal. 1(1): 71-80, pl. 7

Cypraeidae
Gastropods described in 1825
Taxa named by John Edward Gray